Washington County is one of 36 counties in the U.S. state of Oregon and part of the Portland metropolitan area. The 2020 census recorded the population as 600,372, making it the second most populous county in the state and most populous "Washington County" in the United States. Hillsboro is the county seat and largest city, while other major cities include Beaverton, Tigard, Cornelius, Banks, Gaston, Sherwood, North Plains, and Forest Grove, the county's oldest city. Originally named Twality when created in 1843, the Oregon Territorial Legislature renamed it for the nation's first president in 1849 and included the entire northwest corner of Oregon before new counties were created in 1854. The Tualatin River and its drainage basin lie almost entirely within the county, which shares its boundaries with the Tualatin Valley. It is bordered on the west and north by the Northern Oregon Coast Range, on the south by the Chehalem Mountains, and on the north and east by the Tualatin Mountains, or West Hills.

Major roads include sections of Interstate 5 and 205, the Sunset Highway, Oregon Route 217, 47, 10, 6 and 8. Public transportation is primarily operated by TriMet and includes buses, the Westside Express Service commuter rail, and MAX Light Rail. Other transportation includes air travel at Hillsboro Airport, private airfields and heliports, and heavy rail cargo on rail lines.

History

The Provisional Legislature of Oregon created the county as Twality District on July 5, 1843. Twality was one of the original four districts of the Provisional Government of Oregon in Oregon Country along with Clackamas, Champooick (later Marion), and Yamhill counties. Columbia, later known as Hillsboro, was selected as the county seat in 1850. Washington County lost significant portions of its original area when Columbia and Multnomah counties were created in 1854. The area was returned to Washington County to allow for property development.

The construction of Canyon Road to Beaverton helped Portland to consolidate its position as the primary port of Oregon, and defeat the rival efforts of settlements such as Oregon City and Milwaukie.

In November 2004, the County and the City of Beaverton agreed to a plan where the city would annex both unincorporated residential neighborhoods as well as high-value areas of land. This would result with Cedar Hills, Garden Home, Raleigh Hills, West Slope being incorporated by 2010, and the communities of Aloha, Bethany, and Cedar Mill at some point after that.

Those plans have since been put on hold after Beaverton attempted to annex Nike, Inc.'s World Headquarters, which would have increased Nike's taxes substantially. Nike successfully lobbied the legislature for a law that would prohibit their annexation for 99 years. Since that decision, annexation plans have been halted, and Washington County started urban planning to provide city-level services to the unincorporated urban areas in the county.

Geography
The Portland Metro Urban Growth Boundary (UGB) bisects the county. The county's highest point is South Saddle Mountain at 3,464 feet (1,056 m) above sea level in the Northern Oregon Coast Range.

Most of the county is in the Tualatin Valley, formed by the Tualatin Mountains to the east and north, the Chehalem Mountains to the south, and the Northern Oregon Coast Range to the west and north. The Tualatin River, located almost entriely within the county, flows through the Tualatin Plains. The northern and western portions of the county are forested, while the remainder of the county includes urban areas, agricultural lands, and floodplains.

Waterways
The Tualatin River is the main river in Washington County. Henry Hagg Lake, southwest of Forest Grove, is the largest lake. The Willamette River lies to the east, the Columbia River to the northeast, and the Pacific Ocean to the west of the county.

Adjacent counties

 Clatsop County - northwest
 Columbia County - north
 Multnomah County - east
 Clackamas County - southeast
 Yamhill County - south
 Tillamook County - west

Major highways

  Interstate 5 (freeway)
  Interstate 205 (freeway)
  U.S. Route 26 (freeway for part)
  Oregon Route 6
  Oregon Route 8
  Oregon Route 10
  Oregon Route 47
  Oregon Route 99W
  Oregon Route 210
  Oregon Route 217 (freeway)
  Oregon Route 219

National protected areas
 Tualatin River National Wildlife Refuge (part)

Demographics

2000 census
As of the 2000 census, there were 445,342 people, 169,162 households, and 114,015 families in the county. The population density was 615/sqmi (238/km2). There were 178,913 housing units at an average density of 247/sqmi (95/km2). The racial makeup of the county was 82.19% White, 1.15% Black or African American, 0.65% Native American, 6.68% Asian, 0.30% Pacific Islander, 5.86% from other races, and 3.17% from two or more races. 11.17% of the population were Hispanic or Latino of any race. 17.2% were of German, 9.9% English, 8.2% Irish, and 6.7% American ancestry. 81.7% spoke only English at home, while 9.6% spoke Spanish and 1.2% Vietnamese.

There were 169,162 households, out of which 35.60% had children under the age of 18 living with them, 54.50% were married couples living together, 9.00% had a female householder with no husband present, and 32.60% were non-families. 24.70% of all households were made up of individuals, and 6.70% had someone living alone who was 65 years of age or older. The average household size was 2.61 and the average family size was 3.14.

The county population contained 26.90% under the age of 18, 9.30% from 18 to 24, 34.10% from 25 to 44, 20.90% from 45 to 64, and 8.80% who were 65 years of age or older. The median age was 33 years. For every 100 females, there were 99.10 males. For every 100 females age 18 and over, there were 97.00 males.

The median income for a household in the county was $52,122, and the median income for a family was $61,499. Males had a median income of $43,304 versus $31,074 for females. The per capita income for the county was $24,969. About 4.90% of families and 7.40% of the population were below the poverty line, including 8.30% of those under age 18 and 5.30% of those age 65 or over.

2010 census
As of the 2010 census, there were 529,710 people, 200,934 households, and 134,323 families residing in the county. The racial makeup of the county was 76.6% white, 8.6% Asian, 1.8% black or African American, 0.7% American Indian, 0.5% Pacific islander, 7.5% from other races, and 4.3% from two or more races. Those of Hispanic or Latino origin made up 15.7% of the population. In terms of ancestry, 20.8% were German, 12.4% were English, 12.1% were Irish, and 3.2% were American.

Of the 200,934 households, 36.0% had children under the age of 18 living with them, 52.2% were married couples living together, 10.1% had a female householder with no husband present, 33.2% were non-families, and 25.1% of all households were made up of individuals. The average household size was 2.60 and the average family size was 3.14. The median age was 35.3 years.

The median income for a household in the county was $62,574 and the median income for a family was $76,778. Males had a median income of $54,417 versus $40,254 for females. The per capita income for the county was $30,522. About 6.7% of families and 9.5% of the population were below the poverty line, including 12.5% of those under age 18 and 6.7% of those age 65 or over.

Government
The county is governed by an elected board of five commissioners. The county is divided into four commissioner districts. One commissioner sits for each district, and the fifth commissioner is at-large and is the Chair of the board.

Politics
Like all of the Willamette Valley and Oregon Coast, Washington County was in its pre-Depression history strongly Republican. After Oregon achieved statehood in 1859, Washington County voted for the Republican Presidential nominee in every presidential election from 1860 to 1928, except in the 1912 presidential election when the county supported Progressive Party candidate and former Republican President, Theodore Roosevelt. In 1932, Franklin D. Roosevelt became the first Democrat to carry the Washington County vote, and he repeated this in 1936 and 1940. Between 1944 and 1988, Washington County was never won by a Democrat except in Lyndon B. Johnson's 1964 landslide. As late as 1976, Washington County was the second-most Republican county in the state of Oregon behind remote Malheur, with Gerald Ford's 17,529 vote victory in the county being decisive in carrying the state of Oregon for him during that year's Presidential election.

Since the 1990s, the increasing drift of the Republican Party nationally towards the South and evangelicalism, along with urbanization, has resulted in a strong shift of Washington County towards the Democratic Party. No Republican Presidential candidate has carried Washington County since George Bush Sr. did so in 1988, and in three of the past four Presidential elections, Barack Obama, Hillary Clinton and Joe Biden have carried the county by over twenty percentage points. The last Republican to win a statewide election in Washington County was Gordon H. Smith in the 2002 Senate contest. In the 2008 Senatorial election Democrat Jeff Merkley won 48.8 percent of the county's vote (111,367) while Republican incumbent Smith won 46.5 percent (106,114), but no subsequent Republican Senate candidate has won 40 percent of the county's vote. In the 2020 presidential election, Democrat Joe Biden hit 65.5% of the county's vote, the highest ever for a Democratic presidential nominee.

Statewide elections

Economy

Washington County is centered on a fertile plain that attracted farmers before the first wagon trains. In 1997, orchards covered 8,403 acres (34 km2) of the county's lands and 1,163 acres (4.7 km2) were devoted to vineyards. Agriculture is still a major industry in Washington County, as are lumber, manufacturing, and food processing.

The development of a large electronics industry during the 1980s and 1990s is the dominating factor of the county economy, and contributing to the creation of Oregon's Silicon Forest. California-based Intel, Oregon's largest private-sector employer, has its largest concentration of employees in the county, mainly in Hillsboro. Other technology companies include Electro Scientific Industries, FEI Company, Qorvo, Tektronix, SolarWorld, Planar Systems, and EPSON.

Nike, one of two Fortune 500 corporations based in Oregon, has its headquarters in Washington County. Until it was acquired by IBM, Sequent Computer Systems was headquartered near Nike. Other companies with headquarters in Washington County include optical instruments manufacturer Leupold & Stevens, Columbia Sportswear, and Reser's Fine Foods.

Communities

Cities

Census-designated places

 Aloha
 Bethany
 Bull Mountain
 Cedar Hills
 Cedar Mill
 Cherry Grove
 Dilley
 Garden Home–Whitford
 Marlene Village
 Metzger
 Oak Hills
 Raleigh Hills
 Rockcreek
 West Haven-Sylvan
 West Slope

Unincorporated communities

 Bacona
 Balm Grove
 Blooming
 Bonita
 Bonny Slope
 Bradley Corner
 Buckheaven
 Buxton
 Carnation
 Chehalem
 Dixie
 Elmonica
 Farmington
 Gales Creek
 Glencoe
 Glenwood
 Hayward
 Hazeldale
 Helvetia
 Hillside
 Huber
 Kansas City
 Kinton
 Laurel
 Laurelwood
 Manning
 Middleton
 Midway
 Mountaindale
 Mulloy
 Norwood
 Orenco
 Patton
 Progress
 Reedville
 Roy
 Scholls
 Six Corners
 Somerset West
 Tanasbourne
 Thatcher
 Timber
 Tobias
 Verboort
 Watts
 West Union
 Wilkesboro
 Witch Hazel

See also
 National Register of Historic Places listings in Washington County, Oregon
 Washington County Museum
 L. L. "Stub" Stewart State Park
 Ki-a-Kuts Falls
 Washington County Jail
 Washington County Courthouse

References

External links

Washington County Visitors Association

 
1843 establishments in Oregon Country
Populated places established in 1843
Portland metropolitan area counties